Sofia Vladimirovna Vassilieva (born October 22, 1992) is an American actress. Notable roles include portraying the children's book character Eloise in Eloise at the Plaza and Eloise at Christmastime, Ariel DuBois in the Emmy-winning TV series Medium, and teenage cancer patient Kate Fitzgerald in the 2009 film adaptation of My Sister's Keeper by Jodi Picoult.

Early life
Vassilieva was born on October 22, 1992 in Minneapolis, Minnesota, in Hennepin County Medical Center, the only child of Russian immigrants. She attended and graduated from Barbizon Modeling and Acting School in Arizona.

Career
At the age of seven, Vassilieva was discovered at the International Modeling and Talent Association (IMTA) in New York, where she won the title of Child Actress and first runner-up Child Model Of The Year 2000.

Less than a year later, Vassilieva received her first role, playing the granddaughter of a retired Russian general in an episode of the CBS television series The Agency.

Vassilieva played Cindy Brady in The Brady Bunch in the White House, opposite Shelley Long and Gary Cole in 2002. That same year, she was cast as a little girl named Gina in Inhabited (2003), starring Malcolm McDowell and Patty McCormack.

In 2003, she played Eloise in two made-for-television movies: Eloise at the Plaza and Eloise at Christmastime, directed by Kevin Lima and featuring Julie Andrews as Nanny. For her role as Eloise, Vassilieva was nominated for the Best Leading Young Actress in a TV Movie, Miniseries or Special at the 2004 Young Artist Awards.

In May 2004, at the age of eleven, Vassilieva was cast as Ariel DuBois in Medium, a series about mother-of-three and consultant to the Phoenix District Attorney's office Allison DuBois (Patricia Arquette), whose psychic visions help solve crimes. The series premiered on January 3, 2005. Vassilieva played the daughter of Arquette's character for seven seasons, until the series' finale on January 21, 2011.

She was a presenter of Family Feature Film on the Humane Society's 19th Genesis Awards in 2005. She won a Young Artist Award in 2006 for Best Supporting Actress in a TV Drama for her role as Ariel DuBois in Medium.  

Vassilieva played a terminally ill teenager, Kate Fitzgerald, in the 2009 adaptation of Jodi Picoult's novel My Sister's Keeper, directed by Nick Cassavetes. She starred alongside Cameron Diaz, Jason Patric, and Abigail Breslin. Vassilieva shaved her head and eyebrows for her role as a teenage cancer patient. In the same year, she became an honorary ambassador for Stand Up to Cancer. For her performance as Kate, Vassilieva won a Young Artist Award for Best Supporting Actress in a Feature Film in 2010. It was her third nomination and second win.

In 2011, she guest-starred on Law & Order: Special Victims Unit in the episode "True Believers" as Sarah Walsh, a piano BFA candidate who is raped in her New York City apartment. She reprised her role as Sarah in the 2013 episode "Wonderland Story".

On May 21, 2014, Vassilieva graduated from Columbia College, Columbia University with a Bachelor of Arts and Science degree. She has also completed a Linguistics major with honors, and a special concentration in Business Management. Vassilieva is a member of Alpha Omicron Pi, an international women's fraternity.

In 2018 and 2021 Vassilieva worked on Black Lightning as Looker.

Filmography

Video games

References

External links
 

1992 births
American child actresses
American film actresses
American people of Russian descent
American television actresses
Living people
Actresses from Minneapolis
21st-century American actresses
Columbia College (New York) alumni